Anatol Makaraw (born 10 April 1996) is a Belarusian professional footballer who plays for Torpedo-BelAZ Zhodino.

His twin brother Stsyapan Makaraw is also a professional footballer. The brothers played together for Torpedo-BelAZ Zhodino reserves, Slonim-2017 and Smolevichi.

References

External links 
 
 

1996 births
Living people
Twin sportspeople
Belarusian footballers
Association football midfielders
FC Torpedo-BelAZ Zhodino players
FC Slonim-2017 players
FC Smolevichi players